The Wonders of Aladdin (Italian: Le meraviglie di Aladino) is a 1961 Italian-French-American comedy fantasy film directed by Henry Levin (with second unit direction by Mario Bava—uncredited in U.S. prints but credited as sole director in Italy) and produced by Joseph E. Levine for Metro-Goldwyn-Mayer. The film stars Donald O'Connor as the title character.

Cast 
 Donald O'Connor as Aladdin
 Nöelle Adam as Djalma
 Vittorio De Sica as Geni
 Aldo Fabrizi as Sultan
 Michèle Mercier as Princess Zaiha
 Milton Reid as Omar
 Mario Girotti as Prince Moluk
 Fausto Tozzi as Grand Vizier
 Marco Tulli as Fakir

Production
O'Connor signed to make the film in October 1960. O'Connor said "The story of Aladdin has been done by everyone but this is its first time around as a comedy." The Wonders of Aladdin was produced in tandem with two Steve Reeves vehicles, Morgan, the Pirate and The Thief of Baghdad, with producer Joseph E. Levine, set designer Flavio Mogherini, cinematographer Tonino Delli Colli and special effects artist Mario Bava working on all three films; Levine packaged and sold their worldwide distribution rights to MGM.

Shooting
The film was shot in location in Tunisia with studio work in Rome. Filming started December 1960. The Tunisian government were keen to attract filmmakers to the region and provided much assistance, including the loan of their army as soldiers.

According to camera operator Marcello Gatti, Henry Levin directed "80%" of The Wonders of Aladdin, while Bava's on-set contributions consisted of second unit direction and supervising the film's special effects. Because Bava was also in charge of the film's post-production process in Italy, such as its dubbing, Italian and French prints use the credit "A film by Henry Levin, directed by Mario Bava". English language prints only credit Levin with direction.  Tim Lucas notes in his 2020 audio commentary for the Kino Lorber DVD and Blu-Ray that the use of a mosque as a shooting location caused a violent revolt that led to the killing of five people, followed by the killing of a security guard at the American embassy that had cleared the location for the shoot.  Lucas notes that Bava himself had numerous spears pointed at his head during the attack, which he considered the most frightening moment in his life.

While filming in Tunisia in December, Donald O'Connor suffered a blood hemorrhage on this throat and had to be rushed to hospital.

Vittorio De Sica played a small role. It only took a week but the actor said it was "very tiring because of the tricks."

In January, three Americans on the film - O'Connor, Levin and writer Henry Motofsky - accidentally crossed the Tunisian border into Algeria 20 miles south of Tozeur while scouting locations in the Sahara Desert and were arrested. They were held for three hours then returned to the film unit.
Filming finished in March 1961.

"From now on I'll do nothing but drawing room comedies," said O'Connor, "and the only location I'm going on is in my backyard".

Reception

Critical reception 

AllMovie, while not particularly favorable toward the film, called it "a fun movie".

Box office
According to MGM records, the film made a loss of $276,000.

References

External links 
 
 
 
 

1961 films
1960s fantasy adventure films
American fantasy adventure films
English-language Italian films
English-language French films
French fantasy adventure films
Films directed by Henry Levin
Films directed by Mario Bava
Italian fantasy adventure films
Metro-Goldwyn-Mayer films
CinemaScope films
Lux Film films
Films scored by Angelo Francesco Lavagnino
French fantasy comedy films
1960s fantasy comedy films
American fantasy comedy films
1962 comedy films
1962 films
1961 comedy films
1960s English-language films
1960s American films
1960s Italian films
1960s French films